was a statesman, politician and cabinet minister in Taishō and early Shōwa period Japan.

Biography
Adachi was the son of a samurai in the service of the Hosokawa clan of Kumamoto Domain. After the Meiji Restoration, he studied at the academy founded by Sasaki Tokifusa in Kumamoto. In 1894, during the First Sino-Japanese War he travelled to Korea, initially as a free-lance war correspondent, but soon established two Japanese-language newspapers, the Chōsen Jihō and the Keijō Shimpō. He was later charged with being one of the central instigators and organizers of the assassination of Korean Empress Myeongseong, along with Miura Gorō. Together with other members of the plot, he was arrested on his return to Japan, but was acquitted by the Japanese courts.

In the 1902 General Election, Adachi was elected to the House of Representatives of Japan from the Kumamoto general constituency as a member of the Rikken Dōshikai, and was re-elected four consecutive times, serving until 25 December 1914, when he became Deputy Foreign Minister under the Ōkuma Shigenobu administration. He was elected again to the House of Representatives in the 1917 General Election, serving for another eight consecutive terms to 30 April 1942. The Rikken Dōshikai became the Kenseikai in 1916, which merged with the Seiyu Hontō in 1926 to form the Rikken Minseitō. Adachi was active in organizing these mergers and changes, and consistently promoted a hard-line policy towards China.

Adachi was selected to be Communications Minister under the cabinet of Katō Takaaki in May 1925, continuing under the 1st Wakatsuki administration until April 1927. He then served as Home Minister under the Hamaguchi administration from July 1929, continuing in the same post under the second Wakatsuki administration in December 1931. While as Home Minister, he supported bills granting voting rights to women in local elections, as a first step towards women’s suffrage on a national basis.

Adachi split with the Rikken Minseitō in 1931 over disagreements with Prime Minister Wakatsuki’s opposition to the aggressive steps taken by the Imperial Japanese Army in Manchuria and by Wakatsuki's economic policies, and brought down the Wakatsuki administration by boycotting cabinet meetings after his proposals for a coalition with the rival Rikken Seiyūkai were rejected. He formed a new political party, the Kokumin Dōmei in December 1932, together with Nakano Seigō. The new party advocated for a dirigiste economy with government control of strategic industries and financial institutions, and the creation of a Japan-Manchukuo economic union. The party was absorbed into the Taisei Yokusankai in 1940. However, in 1942, Adachi did not run for re-election, and retired from public life. After the surrender of Japan, he was purged by the American occupation authorities. He died in August 1948 at age 83.

References
 Barshay, Andrew. State & Intellectual in Imperial Japan: The Public Man in Crisis. University of California Press (1992). 
 Frederick, Louse. Japan Encyclopedia. Belknap Press (2002). 
 Garon, Sheldon.  Molding Japanese Minds: The State in Everyday Life. Princeton University Press (1998). 
 Hunter, Janet.  A Concise Dictionary of Modern Japanese History . University of California Press (1994). 
 Metzler, Mark.  Lever of Empire: The International Gold Standard and the Crisis of Liberalism in Prewar Japan. University of California Press (2006) 
 Young, Louse. Japan's Total Empire: Manchuria and the Culture of Wartime Imperialism. University of California Press (1999).

Notes

External links

National Diet Library biography

1864 births
1948 deaths
Japanese political journalists
People from Kumamoto
Rikken Dōshikai politicians
20th-century Japanese politicians
Kenseitō politicians
Rikken Minseitō politicians
Government ministers of Japan
Ministers of Home Affairs of Japan
Kokumin Dōmei politicians